Stenoma subita is a moth of the family Depressariidae. It is found in Bolivia.

The wingspan is about 26 mm. The forewings are dark fuscous, darkest towards the dorsum, with some ochreous-brownish suffusion in the middle of the disc and before the termen. The hindwings are white with a very broad dark fuscous terminal band occupying the posterior half of the wing throughout, the dorsum and subdorsal hairs suffused grey.

References

Moths described in 1925
Taxa named by Edward Meyrick
Stenoma